Hyloxalus chlorocraspedus is a species of frogs in the family Dendrobatidae. It is only known from two locations: its type locality near Porto Walter, Acre state in Brazil, and another locality in the Ucayali Region of Peru.

Its natural habitats are primary lowland forests. It is threatened by habitat loss: the area of the type locality has been converted into cattle pasture.

References 

chlorocraspedus
Amphibians of Brazil
Amphibians of Peru
Frogs of South America
Amphibians described in 2005
Taxonomy articles created by Polbot